Organoarsenic chemistry is the chemistry of compounds containing a chemical bond between arsenic and carbon. A few organoarsenic compounds, also called "organoarsenicals," are produced industrially with uses as insecticides, herbicides, and fungicides. In general these applications are declining in step with growing concerns about their impact on the environment and human health. The parent compounds are arsane and arsenic acid. Despite their toxicity, organoarsenic biomolecules are well known.

History

Surprising for an area now considered of minor importance, organoarsenic chemistry played a prominent role in the history of the field of chemistry. The oldest known organoarsenic compound, the foul smelling cacodyl was reported in "cacodyl" (1760) and is sometimes classified as the first synthetic organometallic compound. The compound Salvarsan was one of the first pharmaceuticals, earning a Nobel prize for Paul Ehrlich. Various other organoarsenic compounds formerly found use as antibiotics (Solarson) or other medical uses.

Synthesis and classification
Arsenic typically occurs in the oxidation states (III) and (V), illustrated by the halides AsX3 (X = F, Cl, Br, I) and AsF5. Correspondingly, organoarsenic compounds are commonly found in these two oxidation states.

The hydroxyarsenic compounds are known:
arsonous acids (RAs(OH)2), rare (arsenous acid (As(OH)3) is well known)
arsinous acids (R2AsOH), rare
arsinic acids (R2As(O)OH), common, illustrated by cacodylic acid (R = CH3)
arsonic acids (RAs(O)(OH)2), common, illustrated by phenylarsonic acid (R = C6H5)

Organoarsenic(V) compounds and uses
Arsenic(V) compounds typically feature the functional groups RAsO(OH)2 or R2AsO(OH) (R = alkyl or aryl). Biomethylation of arsenic compounds starts with the formation of methanearsonates.  Thus, trivalent inorganic arsenic compounds are methylated to give methanearsonate. S-adenosylmethionine is the methyl donor.  The methanearsonates are the precursors to dimethylarsonates, again by the cycle of reduction (to methylarsonous acid) followed by a second methylation. This dimethyl compound is cacodylic acid  figures prominently throughout the chemistry of organoarsenic compounds. In contrast, the dimethylphosphonic acid is less significant in the corresponding chemistry of phosphorus. Cacodylic acid arises from the methylation of arsenic(III) oxide. Phenylarsonic acids can be accessed by the reaction of arsenic acid with anilines, the so-called Bechamp reaction.

The monomethylated acid, methanearsonic acid (CH3AsO(OH)2), is a precursor to fungicides (tradename Neoasozin) in the cultivation of rice and cotton. Derivatives of phenylarsonic acid (C6H5AsO(OH)2) are used as feed additives for livestock, including 4-hydroxy-3-nitrobenzenearsonic acid (3-NHPAA or Roxarsone), ureidophenylarsonic acid and p-arsanilic acid. These applications are controversial as they introduce soluble forms of arsenic into the environment.

Compounds of arsenic(V) containing only organic ligands are rare, the pre-eminent member being the pentaphenyl derivative As(C6H5)5.

Organoarsenic(III) compounds and uses
Most such compounds are prepared by alkylation of AsCl3 and its derivatives using organolithium and Grignard reagents. For example, the series trimethylarsine ((CH3)3As), dimethylarsenic chloride ((CH3)2AsCl), and methylarsenic dichloride (CH3AsCl2) is known. Reduction of the chloride derivatives with hydride reducing reagents affords the corresponding hydrides, such as dimethylarsine ((CH3)2AsH) and methylarsine (CH3AsH2). Similar manipulations apply to other organoarsenic chloride compounds.

An important route to dimethylarsenic compounds begin with reduction of cacodylic acid (see above):
(CH3)2AsO2H + 2 Zn + 4 HCl → (CH3)2AsH + 2 ZnCl2 + 2 H2O
(CH3)2AsO2H + SO2 + HI → (CH3)2AsI + SO3 + H2O

A variety of heterocycles containing arsenic(III) are known. These include arsole, the arsenic analogue of pyrrole, and arsabenzene, the arsenic analogue of pyridine.

Symmetrical organoarsenic(III) compounds, e.g. trimethylarsine and triphenylarsine, are commonly used as ligands in coordination chemistry. They behave like phosphine ligands, but are less basic. The diarsine C6H4(As(CH3)2)2, known as diars, is a chelating ligand. Thorin is an indicator for several metals.

Organoarsenic(I) compounds and uses
Least significant in terms of commercial uses and numbers are the organoarsenic(I) compounds. The anti-syphylic drugs Salvarsan and Neosalvarsan are representative of this class. These compounds typically feature three bonds to As, but only As-As single bonds.

Arsaalkenes and arsaalkynes
Following the pattern described by the double bond rule, compounds with As=As, As=C, and As≡C bonds are rare.  They are observed in the gas phase but as liquids or solids, considerable steric protection is required to inhibit their conversion to oligomers.

Chemical warfare
Organoarsenic compounds, especially those featuring As-Cl bonds, have been used as chemical weapons, especially during World War I. Infamous examples include "Lewisite" (chlorovinyl-2-arsenic dichloride) and "Clark I" (chlorodiphenylarsine). Phenyldichloroarsine is another one.

In nature
As arsenic is toxic to most life forms and it occurs in elevated concentration in some areas several detoxification strategies have evolved. Inorganic arsenic and its compounds, upon entering the food chain, are progressively metabolized to a less toxic form of arsenic through a process of methylation. Organoarsenic compounds arise via biomethylation of inorganic arsenic compounds, via processes mediated by enzymes related to vitamin B12. For example, the mold Scopulariopsis brevicaulis produces significant amounts of trimethylarsine if inorganic arsenic is present. The organic compound arsenobetaine, a betaine, is found in some marine foods such as fish and algae, and also in mushrooms in larger concentrations. The average person's intake is about 10-50 µg/day. Values about 1000 µg are not unusual following consumption of fish or mushrooms. But there is little danger in eating fish because this arsenic compound is nearly non-toxic. Arsenobetaine was first identified in the Western rock lobster

Saccharides bound to arsenic, collectively known as arsenosugars, are found especially in seaweeds. Arsenic containing lipids are also known. Although arsenic and its compounds are toxic for humans, one of the first synthetic antibiotics was Salvarsan, the use of which has long been discontinued.

The only polyarsenic compound isolated from a natural source is arsenicin A, found in the New Caledonian marine sponge Echinochalina bargibanti.

Organoarsenic compounds may pose significant health hazards, depending on their speciation.  Arsenous acid (As(OH)3) has an LD50 of 34.5 mg/kg (mice) whereas for the betaine (CH3)3As+CH2CO2− the LD50 exceeds 10 g/kg.

Representative compounds
Some illustrative organoarsenic compound are listed in the table below:

Nomenclature
The naming of cyclic organoarsenic compounds is based on an extension of the Hantzsch–Widman nomenclature system approved by IUPAC, as summarized below:

Because of its similarity to the English slang word "arsehole" (in common use outside North America), the name "arsole" has been considered a target of fun, a "silly name", and one of several chemical compounds with an unusual name. However, this "silly name" coincidence has also stimulated detailed scientific studies.

See also
 Arsenic biochemistry
 Arsenic poisoning
 Arsenic toxicity
 :Category:Arsenic compounds

References